Acosmeryx is a genus of moths in the family Sphingidae. The genus was erected by Jean Baptiste Boisduval in 1875.

Species
Acosmeryx acteus Pagenstecher, 1898
Acosmeryx anceoides Boisduval, 1875
Acosmeryx anceus (Stoll, 1781)
Acosmeryx beatae Cadiou, 2005
Acosmeryx castanea Rothschild & Jordan, 1903
Acosmeryx formosana (Matsumura, 1927)
Acosmeryx miskini (Murray, 1873)
Acosmeryx miskinoides Vaglia & Haxaire, 2007
Acosmeryx naga (Moore, 1858)
Acosmeryx omissa Rothschild & Jordan, 1903
Acosmeryx pseudomissa Mell, 1922
Acosmeryx pseudonaga Butler, 1881
Acosmeryx sericeus (Walker, 1856)
Acosmeryx shervillii Boisduval, 1875
Acosmeryx sinjaevi Brechlin & Kitching, 1996
Acosmeryx socrates Boisduval, 1875
Acosmeryx tenggarensis Brechlin & Kitching, 2007

References

 
Macroglossini
Moth genera
Taxa named by Jean Baptiste Boisduval